Son of Rogues Gallery: Pirate Ballads, Sea Songs & Chanteys is a compilation album of sea shanties and the follow-up to Rogue's Gallery: Pirate Ballads, Sea Songs, and Chanteys. The concept is the same as it was on the first album: artists representing a variety of genres perform cover versions of sea shanties. Performers include musicians like Tom Waits, Iggy Pop, Big Freedia, Patti Smith, Sean Lennon, Petra Haden, Dr. John, Nick Cave, Shane MacGowan, Macy Gray, Courtney Love, Michael Stipe, Keith Richards, and Frank Zappa, alongside actors like Johnny Depp, Angelica Huston, and Tim Robbins.

Track listing
All songs traditional, except where noted.

Track information
There are two songs that have been released previously to this compilation. The instrumental medley "Wedding Dress Song/Handsome Cabin Boy" by Frank Zappa & the Mothers of Invention was recorded between 1962 and 1972 and first released as part of the 1998 compilation album Mystery Disc. Secondly, Marianne Faithfull's "Flandyke Shore" featuring sisters Anna & Kate McGarrigle was originally released on Faithfull's 2008 cover-album Easy Come, Easy Go.

References

External links
 Son of Rogue's Gallery on ANTI- Records website
 Son of Rogue's Gallery on Kingsroadmerch

2013 compilation albums
Albums produced by Hal Willner
Anti- (record label) compilation albums
Folk compilation albums
Sea shanties albums